Conocybe apala is a basidiomycete fungus and a member of the genus Conocybe. It is a fairly common fungus, both in North America and Europe, found growing among short green grass. Until recently, the species was also commonly called Conocybe lactea or Conocybe albipes and is colloquially known as the white dunce cap or the milky conecap.  Another common synonym, Bolbitius albipes G.H. Otth 1871, places the fungus in the genus Bolbitius.

Description
Very easily missed due to their very small size, C. apala fruit bodies are otherwise quite easy to identify. The cap has a pale cream to silvery-white colour and may sometimes have a darker yellow to brown coloration towards the central umbo. Its trademark hood-shaped conical cap expands with age and may flatten out, the surface being marked by minute radiating ridges. The cap ranges from 1–3 cm in diameter. The gills may be visible through the thin cap and these are coloured rust or cinnamon brown and quite dense. They are adnexed or free and release brown to reddish-brown elliptical spores producing a spore print of the same colour. The stem is cap-coloured, elongated, thin, hollow and more or less equal along its length with a height up to 11 cm and diameter of 1–3 mm. It can bear minuscule striations or hairs. The flesh of C. apala has no discernible taste or smell and is extremely fragile to the touch. Its cap can be from 1-2.5 centimeters.

Similar species 
Similar species include Conocybe filaris and Conocybe tenera.

Habitat
Conocybe apala is a saprobe found in areas with rich soil and short grass such as pastures, playing fields, lawns, meadows as well as rotting manured straw, fruiting single or sparingly few ephemeral bodies. It is commonly found fruiting during humid, rainy weather with generally overcast skies. It will appear on sunny mornings while there is dew but will not persist once it evaporates. In most cases, by midday the delicate fruiting bodies shrivel, dry and bend from sight. C.apala's fruiting season begins in spring and ends in autumn. It is distributed across Europe and North America.

Edibility
While it has not caused deaths, it is toxic, containing phallotoxins. It is also too small to be of interest.
However, this mushroom is healthy and can be edible, by choice, though it is not highly recommended to consume it.

External links and resources
 Mushroom Expert - Conocybe albipes
 MykoWeb California Fungi - Conocybe lactea

Bolbitiaceae
Fungi of Europe
Fungi of North America
Poisonous fungi
Fungi described in 2003